Ghemme is a comune (municipality) in the Province of Novara in the Italian region Piedmont, located on the river Sesia about  northeast of Turin and about  northwest of Novara.

It is the birthplace of architect Alessandro Antonelli and the town of origin of Blessed Panacea De' Muzzi. The main attraction is the castle (Castello-ricetto), built in the 11th to 15th centuries.

Ghemme is notable for its red wine.

References

External links
 Official website